Mandarin Chinese is the primary formal Chinese language taught academically to Chinese Filipinos in Chinese Filipino schools and across other schools and institutions in the Philippines, especially as the formal written Chinese language.

Both Standard Chinese (PRC) (known in ) and Taiwanese Mandarin (ROC) (known in many schools in Hokkien ) are taught and spoken in the Philippines depending on the school, with some schools and speakers using Simplified Chinese characters, some using Traditional Chinese characters, and some using a mixture of both. Meanwhile, Chinese language publications have traditionally used Traditional Chinese characters.

Mandarin Chinese is formally used in print publications in Chinese language newspapers and books in the Philippines, such as World News, United Daily News, Chinese Commercial News, and many others.

Classification
Mandarin in the Philippines can be classified into two distinct Mandarin dialects: Standard Mandarin and Colloquial Mandarin. Standard Mandarin is either the standard language of Mainland China or Taiwan, while Colloquial Mandarin in the Philippines tends to combine features from Mandarin and features from Hokkien of the local Philippine Hokkien dialect, which is the heritage language of many Chinese Filipinos.

Usage

Only a small minority of Chinese Filipinos claim Mandarin as their native first language, with Tagalog or English typically being the first language. The lack of environment for speaking the language and the difficulty of learning it created not just a lack of interest, but even great disgust by some towards it.

Efforts in the 21st century to promote Mandarin Chinese education in Chinese Filipino institutions and recent utilitarian trends, such as more Mandarin job opportunities, recent immigrants from China or Taiwan, summer education trips to China or Taiwan, encouragement of universities and schools by past presidents, and education exchange deals with China have spurred interest and potential for growth in the usage of Mandarin.

Code-switching
Sometimes Chinese Filipinos also code-switch Mandarin together with other languages, such as English, Tagalog (or other Philippine languages), and Hokkien, as a form of pidgin language, just like Hokaglish or Singlish.

Education

There are about 150 or so Chinese schools that exist throughout the Philippines, around a third of which operate in Metro Manila. Most education of Standard Chinese (Mandarin) provided in the Philippines is facilitated through Chinese Filipino schools established by Chinese Filipinos, which typically include the teaching of Standard Chinese (Mandarin) along with other school class subjects.

In terms of phonology, vocabulary and grammar, the "Chinese" (Mandarin) taught during most of the 20th century in the Philippines in many older Chinese Filipino schools was often the Taiwanese variety (known in Mandarin  and in Hokkien ) of Standard Chinese, using Traditional Chinese characters and the Zhuyin phonetic system (known in many older Chinese Filipino schools in Hokkien ), which was also often taught using Amoy Hokkien Chinese as medium of instruction due to the majority of Chinese Filipinos in Chinese Filipino schools being of Hokkien descent and historic ties to Southern Fujian. This was in due part as a result of the direct control formerly provided to the Republic of China's Ministry of Education over Chinese schools throughout the archipelago after World War II when the Third Republic of the Philippines and the Republic of China (ROC) signed the Sino-Philippine Treaty of Amity. As a result of the Chinese Civil War, the Republic of China (ROC) soon retreated to Taiwan (ROC), where it rules today. Such situation continued until 1973, when amendments made during the Marcos Era to the Philippine Constitution effectively transferred all Chinese schools to the authority of the Department of Education (DepEd) of the Philippines. With this, the medium of instruction for teaching Standard Chinese (Mandarin) in Chinese classes shifted from Amoy Hokkien Chinese to purely Mandarin Chinese (or in some schools to English). Teaching hours relegated to Chinese language and arts, which featured prominently in the pre-1973 Chinese schools, were reduced. Lessons in Chinese geography and history, which were previously subjects in their own right, were integrated with the Chinese language subjects, whereas, the teaching of Filipino (Tagalog) and Philippine history, civics and culture became new required subjects. As a result of longstanding influence from the ROC Ministry of Education of the Overseas Chinese Affairs Council of the Republic of China (Taiwan) extending from when the Republic of China was still on Mainland China since the early 1900s up to 2000, many Chinese Filipino schools still continued to use dictionaries and books from Taiwan (ROC). In recent decades around the early 2000s, many schools started to shift to using Simplified Chinese characters and the Pinyin phonetic system instead, which were introduced from China and Singapore, where books and teaching materials from Mainland China, Singapore, and Malaysia started to be used and taught. Today, many Chinese Filipino schools now currently teach Chinese (Mandarin) in Simplified characters with the Pinyin system, modeled after those in China and Singapore, though some older schools still teach both or either of the systems, where a few still remain teaching solely in Traditional Chinese characters and the Zhuyin phonetic system. Chinese (Mandarin) newspapers in the Philippines, such as World News, United Daily News, Chinese Commercial News, and many others still mostly use Traditional Chinese characters in writing. Due to the selection by the founders and sponsors of different Chinese schools, many schools now either teach using Simplified Chinese characters only, Traditional Chinese characters only, or a mixture of both. Many Chinese Filipino schools either use pinyin and/or bopomofo (zhuyin fuhao) to teach the language.

Chinese Filipino schools often use the first language approach, which assumes that students of Chinese Filipino schools have had native experience of Mandarin, despite the contrary.

See also
Philippine Hokkien
Languages of Philippines
List of Chinese schools in the Philippines

Notes

References

Chinese-Filipino culture
Mandarin Chinese